The flag of Amazonas is one of the official symbols of the state of Amazonas, Brazil. The current flag was introduced by Law 1513 of 14 January 1982.

Symbolism 
The twenty-five stars in the upper left corner represent the twenty-five municipalities of the state in 1897, the year that the Military Forces of Amazonas entered into the War of Canudos. The largest star, in the center, represents the capital, Manaus. The two horizontal white bands represent hope, the dark blue of the quadratic drawing, the skies and the red band represents overcoming difficulties.

References

Flags of Brazil
Flags introduced in 1982
1982 establishments in Brazil
Amazonas (Brazilian state)
Amazonas